Cornil is a commune in the Corrèze department in central France. Cornil station has rail connections to Brive-la-Gaillarde, Ussel, Tulle and Bordeaux.

Population

See also
Communes of the Corrèze department

References

Communes of Corrèze